is a train station on the West Japan Railway Company (JR West) Osaka Loop Line in Miyakojima-ku, Osaka, Japan.

Layout
There are two side platforms with two tracks elevated.

History
The station opened on 27 April 1898 on the exiting railway that would be called the Osaka Loop Line. Between 21 December 1901 and 15 November 1913, the Sakuranomiya Line connected Sakuranomiya and Hanaten Station on the present-day Katamachi Line.

Station numbering was introduced in March 2018 with Sakuranomiya being assigned station number JR-O09.

Surroundings
Osaka City General Hospital
Miyakojima Station (Osaka Municipal Subway Tanimachi Line)
Osaka Amenity Park (OAP)

Stations next to Sakuranomiya

Past railway line

References

Railway stations in Japan opened in 1898
Railway stations in Osaka Prefecture